In Praise of Slow (U.S. title In Praise of Slowness: Challenging the Cult of Speed) is a book by Carl Honoré containing his analysis of the "Cult of Speed", which he claims is becoming the societal standard all over the world.  He discusses and gives praise to the Slow Movement and the various groups around the world representative of this movement.

External links
 

2004 non-fiction books
Slow movement